Macquaria is a genus of medium-sized, predatory temperate perches endemic to Australia.  They are found in rivers and estuaries of the eastern part of the continent.

Species
The currently recognized species in this genus are:
 Macquaria ambigua (J. Richardson, 1845), commonly known as golden perch or "yellowbelly"
 Macquaria australasica (G. Cuvier, 1830), commonly known as Macquarie perch
 Macquaria colonorum (Günther, 1863), commonly known as estuary perch
 Macquaria novemaculeata (Steindachner, 1866), commonly known as Australian bass

Taxonomy
Some workers have found that the genus Macquaria is polyphyletic and that the two catadromous species Macquaria colonorum and M. novemaculeata are not the closest relatives of the other two species in the genus and are placed in the genus Percalates in the monotypic family Percalatidae These authors also found that the Percichthyidae and the Percalatidae were part of one of three cladea within a new order, the Centrarchiformes in the Percomorpha.

References

 
Percichthyidae
Freshwater fish genera
Taxa named by Georges Cuvier